{{DISPLAYTITLE:C10H7NO4}}
The molecular formula C10H7NO4 (molar mass: 205.17 g/mol, exact mass: 205.0375 u) may refer to:

 6-Hydroxykynurenic acid
 Xanthurenic acid, or xanthurenate